Protection Township is a township in Comanche County, Kansas, United States.  As of the 2000 census, its population was 734.

Geography
According to the USGS, it contains two cemeteries: Mennonite and Protection.

The township borders Oklahoma on the south.

The streams of Bluff Creek, Buzzard Creek, Cavalry Creek, Kiowa Creek, East Kiowa Creek, Middle Kiowa Creek, West Kiowa Creek, Nichols Creek, Wiggins Creek and Willow Creek run through this township. The Cimarron River traverses the southwest corner of the township, coming in from the west and curving south into Oklahoma.

Transportation
Protection is crossed by US Route 183, concurrent with US Route 160 (east/west).

Protection Municipal Airport was just southwest of the town of Protection, but is no longer operational.  Commercial air transportation is available out of Dodge City Regional Airport,  about 58 miles to the northwest of town.

References

 USGS Geographic Names Information System (GNIS)

External links
 US-Counties.com
 City-Data.com

Townships in Comanche County, Kansas
Townships in Kansas